Antonio Cabrera may refer to:

Antonio Cabrera (Argentine footballer) (born 1943), Argentine footballer
Antonio Cabrera (Paraguayan footballer), Paraguayan footballer
Antonio Cabrera (cyclist) (born 1981), Chilean track cyclist